Glyphipterix haplographa is a species of sedge moth in the genus Glyphipterix. It was described by Turner in 1926. It is found in Australia, including Tasmania.

The wingspan is about 10 mm. The forewings are blackish with two slender white transverse fasciae, the first at one-third and the second at two-thirds. There is a white costal dot before the apex, partly in the cilia. The hindwings are grey.

References

Moths described in 1926
Glyphipterigidae
Moths of Australia